Teeton is a village in Hollowell  civil parish, part of West Northamptonshire in England.

The village's name means 'Beacon'. The village is situated on the end of a ridge.

References

External links 

Villages in Northamptonshire
West Northamptonshire District